Sapphire flutterer may refer to:

 Rhyothemis princeps, a species of dragonfly found in Australia and New Guinea
 Rhyothemis triangularis, a species of dragonfly found in eastern and southern Asia